Ulwazi FM is a South African community radio station based in the Northern Cape.

Coverage Areas & Frequencies 
Emthanjeni Local Municipality in Pixley ka Seme District Municipality, De Aar (88.9 FM).

Broadcast Languages
English
Afrikaans
isiXhosa

Broadcast Time
24/7

Target Audience
LSM Groups 1 – 8

Listenership Figures

References

External links
SAARF Website
Sentech Website

.

Community radio stations in South Africa
Mass media in the Northern Cape
Pixley ka Seme District Municipality